Oliver Peoples is an American luxury eyewear brand established in 1986, and owned by Luxottica. The brand is sold in Oliver Peoples boutiques, online, and in fashion boutiques and department stores throughout the world. Oliver Peoples eyewear is designed in Los Angeles, Italy, and Japan.

History
Oliver Peoples was founded by Larry Leight and his brother Dennis Leight in 1986. Before they launched the company, Kenny Schwartz and Larry Leight worked as an opticians. They would draw glasses on the celebrities in Vogue. In 1984, Leight designed a frame, later named "Identity," that was fabricated for pop artist Andy Warhol. Warhol wore the glasses for an editorial spread published in the German magazine Männer Vogue in 1987.

In 1986, while Schwartz and the Leight brothers were searching for eyewear brands to stock their new boutique in West Hollywood, California, they purchased a bulk lot of American brand name frames in their original packaging for $5,000 at an auction in Connecticut. While going through the inventory, a receipt was found naming the frames' original owner, Oliver Peoples. The brothers named the company after him.

In 2006, Oakley acquired Oliver Peoples for $46.7 million. In 2007, Oakley was purchased by eyewear giant Luxottica.

Film

1991, Oliver Peoples is mentioned in Bret Easton Ellis’ American Psycho. The film adaptation, released in 2000, features Christian Bale in the iconic Oliver Peoples O’Malley frame. The same year, Julia Roberts wears M-4 Sun in Dying Young.

1993, Whoopi Goldbergs wears MP-2  in Sister Act 2: Back in the Habit. Also in 1993, Laura Dern wore Oliver Peoples glasses in Jurassic Park.

1997, Bruce Willis wears O’Malley Sun in The Jackal.

1999, Brad Pitt wears Oliver Peoples styles in Fight Club.

2004, Denzel Washington, wears Oliver Peoples in Man On Fire.

2005, Brad Pitt and Angelina Jolie wear Oliver Peoples in Mr. & Mrs. Smith.

2022, Kevin Costner wears Oliver Peoples in the TV series, Yellowstone.

2022, Theo James and Aubrey Plaza wear Oliver Peoples in the HBO series White Lotus.

Collaborations

In 1994, Oliver Peoples and Sir Elton John collaborate to create a series of frames with a portion of the proceeds going to the Elton John AIDS Foundation. LINK This marks the first collaboration with the brand.

In 2009, Oliver Peoples collaborated with actress Zooey Deschanel for a signature pair of sunglasses called "Zooey."

In 2012, Oliver Peoples collaborated with the Peck estate to launch the Gregory Peck style inspired by Peck’s character in the film, To Kill a Mockingbird.

In 2013, Oliver Peoples collaborated with French women’s brand, Isabel Marant.

In 2015, Oliver Peoples collaborated with Rodarte., Public School. and fragrance brand Byredo.

In 2016, Oliver Peoples collaborated with the luxury fashion label established by Mary-Kate and Ashley Olsen, The Row.

In 2019, Oliver Peoples collaborate with the Grant estate to launch the Cary Grant style inspired by Grant’s character in the film, North by Northwest.

In 2020, Oliver Peoples collaborated with premium audio company, Master & Dynamic.

In 2021, Oliver Peoples collaborated with Italian luxury brand, Brunello Cucinelli, and fashion house, Frère.

In 2023, Oliver Peoples collaborated with LA streetwear brand, Madhappy. The same year, they also launched an exclusive line with New York womenswear brand, Khaite.

Boutiques

As of 2022, the brand has 35 stores in North America, Europe, and Asia.

See also
 Warby Parker
 Ray-Ban

References

Luxottica
Eyewear brands of the United States
American companies established in 1986
Manufacturing companies established in 1986
Eyewear companies of the United States
Companies based in Los Angeles
1986 establishments in California